The men's 4 x 400 metres relay at the 2010 European Athletics Championships was held at the Estadi Olímpic Lluís Companys on 31 July and 1 August.

Medalists

Records

Schedule

Results

Round 1
First 3 in each heat (Q) and 2 best performers (q) advance to the Final.

Heat 1

Heat 2

Summary

Final

References
 Round 1 Results
 Final Results
Full results

Relay 4 x 400
4 x 400 metres relay at the European Athletics Championships